Charles Hurlbut "Dutch" Sterrett (October 1, 1889 – December 9, 1965) was a professional baseball player who played 2 seasons for the New York Yankees of Major League Baseball.  Sterrett posted a .253 batting average for his major league career, seeing action mostly in the outfield, at first base, and as a catcher.  Sterrett also played part of a season for the Venice Tigers of the Pacific Coast League, hitting .299 in thirty-five games.

Sterrett played college baseball at Princeton University.

References

Sources

Major League Baseball pitchers
New York Highlanders players
New York Yankees players
Baseball players from Pennsylvania
Princeton Tigers baseball players
1889 births
1965 deaths
Venice Tigers players